The Yugoslav National Road Race Championship was a cycling race where the Yugoslav cyclists decide who will become the champion for the year to come. The event was established in 1919. The winners of each event were awarded with a symbolic cycling jersey which was in the colours of the national flag. Most of the top riders came from the territories of today's Croatia and Slovenia, where the majority of races were held.

Men

See also
National Road Cycling Championships

References

National road cycling championships
Cycle races in Yugoslavia
Recurring sporting events established in 1919